Giridih Sadar subdivision is an administrative subdivision of the Giridih district in the state of Jharkhand, India.

History
In 1837, according to old British records, Hazaribagh district was divided into 12 police stations (thanas) of which Kharagdiha was one. Kharagdiha PS controlled the whole of what subsequently formed the Giridih subdivision, except Gawan, which had a zamindari thana, the expenses of which were not borne by the British government. A new police station was opened in 1838 at Bagodar on the then new Grand Trunk Road. In 1870, the Giridih subdivision was formed with its headquarters at Karharbari, in the heart of the coal-mining area. In 1871, the railway line from Madhupur to Giridih was laid primarily for coal transportation. At that time police stations in Giridh subdivision included Gawan, Satgawan, Jamua, Deori, Dhanwar, Birni, Giridih, Bengabad, Gandey, Dumri, Nawadih, Pirtand, and Bermo. Later on, Bagodar police station was added to the subdivision and Satgawan was deleted. Giridih district was formed on 6 December 1972. In earlier days it had two subdivisions, Giridih and Bermo. In 1991, at the time of formation of Bokaro district, Bermo subdivision, with Nawadih, Bermo, Gomia and Peterwar, was transferred to the new district.

Subdivisions
Giridih district is divided into the following administrative subdivisions:

Police stations
Police stations in Giridih Sadar subdivision have the following features and jurisdiction:

Blocks
Community development blocks in Giridih Sadar subdivision are:

Education
Given in the table below (data in numbers) is a comprehensive picture of the education scenario in Giridih district:

Note: While Giridih district provides information that many others do not, there has been a slip. The education data for Giridih Sadar subdivision does not include data for Bengabad CD Block.

Educational institutions
There is a special institution in this subdivision:
Jawahar Navodaya Vidyalaya was established in 1994 at Gandey. It is a co-educational residential school for children from class VI to class XII. These schools provide free high-quality education plus ample extra-curricular activities, boarding, lodging etc. for talented rural children. Navodaya Vidyalaya Samiti, an autonomous body under the HRD Ministry, Government of India, manages these schools.

The following institutions are located in Giridih Sadar subdivision:
Giridih College, established at Giridih in 1955, offers courses at the intermediate and bachelors levels in arts, science and commerce, and Bachelor of Education. The featured courses of the college are: arts, commerce, botany, chemistry and anthropology.
Sri Ram Krishna Mahila College, was established at New Barganda, Giridih in 1978, on property donated by Rani Mahalanobis, wife of the eminent scientist, Prasanta Chandra Mahalanobis. It offers courses in arts, science and commerce.
Khandoli Institute of Technology, established in 2014 at Giridih, offers diploma courses in mining, mechanical, civil and electrical engineering.
Kalu Ram Modi Memorial Vananchal  College is affiliated with Vinoba Bhave University.
K.K.Verma Evening College at Bergi, Giridih is affiliated with Vinoba Bhave University.
G.D. Bagaria Evening College at Giridih is affiliated with Vinoba Bhave University.
Subhash Teachers Training College, GD Bagaria TT College, BN Saha DAV Teachers Training College, Scholar B.Ed. college and K.N.Bakshi College of Education  are located in this subdivision.

References

External links

Sub-divisions in Giridih district